Citrobacter braakii is a Gram-negative species of bacteria.  It has been reported to cause sepsis in an immunocompromised person.

References

Further reading

External links

LPSN
Type strain of Citrobacter braakii at BacDive -  the Bacterial Diversity Metadatabase

braakii
Bacteria described in 1993